Chloe Liked Olivia is the third and final album by Two Nice Girls, released on Rough Trade records in 1991.  The label closed down and the band broke up shortly after this album was released. Chicago Tribune critic Dan Kening rated the album 3 stars (out of 4) for its "affecting, eye-opening music worth seeking out", while Mark Jenkins of The Washington Post thought it was "barely distinguishable from most other easy-listening adult-rock" and that the band had been "more fun when they're naughty."

Curve magazine later listed the album as one of "10 albums every lesbian must own"
The title is taken from Virginia Woolf's feminist essay "A Room of One's Own".

Track listing
Let's Go Bonding (Gretchen Phillips)
Eleven (Kathy Korniloff)
For The Inauguration (Gretchen Phillips)
Princess Of Power (Gretchen Phillips)
Throw It All Away (Meg Hentges)
Rational Heart (Kathy Korniloff)
The Queer Song (Gretchen Phillips)
Only Today (Pam Barger)
Noona's Revenge (Meg Hentges/Judith Ferguson)
Swimming In Circles (Pam Barger)

Personnel
Gretchen Phillips - guitar, bass & vocals
Kathy Korniloff - guitar, bass & vocals
Meg Hentges - guitar, bass & vocals
Pam Barger - drums

References

1991 albums
Two Nice Girls albums
Rough Trade Records albums